This list of strongmen is a list of people who are renowned for their feats of strength.

Ancient Greeks

 Bybon, early 6th century BC weight lifter
 Milo of Croton, 6th century BC wrestler, reputed to have carried a bull on his shoulders by practicing daily since it was a calf.  He saved Pythagoras by supporting the roof of a hall when a pillar collapsed.

A

 Aleksander Aberg
 Otto Acron
 Jouko Ahola
 Bill Anderson
 Paul Anderson
 Johannes Arsjo
 Evans Aryee
 Don Athaldo
 Charles Atlas, known as the "world's most perfectly developed man", his feats included bending iron bars and pulling a train with his bare hands.

B
 Patrik Baboumian
 Gerrit Badenhorst
 William Bankier
 Antonio Barichievich (1925–2003), also known as the Great Antonio, Croatian-Canadian strongman, professional wrestler and eccentric
 Matjaz Belsak
 Gerard Benderoth 
 Raimonds Bergmanis
 Jason Bergmann
 Nick Best
 Adam Bishop
 Hafthór Júlíus Björnsson
 Jerry Blackwell
 Vidas Blekaitis
 Maxime Boudreault
 Andy Bolton
 Zishe Breitbart
 Mike Burke
 Samuel Burmister

C
 Jean-Francois Caron
 Geoff Capes
 Cees de Vreugd
 Georges Christen
 Ed Coan
 Jon Cole
 Franco Columbu
 Forbes Cowan
 Louis Cyr

D
 Donald Dinnie
 George Dinnie
 Jarek Dymek
 Mills Darden
 Gerard Du Prie
 Valentin Dikul

E
 Johan Els
 Gregor Edmunds

F
 Mark Felix
 Dominic Filiou

G
 The Great Gama
 John B. Gagnon
 Karl Gillingham
 Hugo Girard
 Hermann Görner
 Mick Gosling
 Richard Gosling
 Angus Graham
 Mike Greenstein
 Joe Greenstein

H
 Georg Hackenschmidt
 Eddie Hall
 Jarno Hams
 Arild Haugen
 Lars Hedlund
 Rauno Heinla
 Mark Henry
 Doug Hepburn
 Graham Hicks
 Manfred Hoeberl
 Terry Hollands

I
 Marc Iliffe
 Konstiantyn Ilin
 Thomas Inch

J
 Konstantine Janashia
 Louis-Philippe Jean
 Mike Jenkins — Arnold Strongman champion in 2012.
 Nathan Jones (born 1967), Australian actor, powerlifting champion, strongman and professional wrestler
 Milan Jovanović (born 1970)

K
 Svend Karlsen
 Ervin Katona
 Bill Kazmaier
 Rob Kearney
 Mateusz Kieliszkowski
 Riku Kiri
 Alexander Klyushev
 Mikhail Koklyaev

L
 Vytautas Lalas
 Lars Rørbakken
 Jimmy Laureys
 Signor Lawanda
 Martins Licis
 Georg Lurich

M
 Angus MacAskill
 Magnús Ver Magnússon
 Benedikt Magnússon
 Jimmy Marku
 Jesse Marunde
 John Matuszak
 Billy Meeske
 Tarmo Mitt
 Joseph Montferrand
 Andrus Murumets
 Tom Magee
 Martin Muhr

N
 Kodi Rammurthy Naidu (1882–1942), Indian bodybuilder
 Kevin Nee
 Konstantin Nerchenko
 Oleksii Novikov
 Ilkka Nummisto

O
 Robert Oberst
 Brian Oldfield
 Travis Ortmayer
 Sławomir Orzeł
 David Ostlund

P
 Ted van der Parre
 Ken Patera
 Jessen Paulin
 Igor Pedan
 Johnny Perry
 Stefán Sölvi Pétursson
 Phil Pfister
 Ivan Poddubny
 Derek Poundstone
 Wayne Price
 Mariusz Pudzianowski
 Ivan Putski

R
 Stanley Radwan
 Krzysztof Radzikowski
 Flemming Rasmussen
 Jamie Reeves
 Don Reinhoudt
 Luke Richardson
 Joe Rollino
 Glenn Ross

S

 Darren Sadler
 Frank Saldo
 Monte Saldo
 Magnus Samuelsson
 Eugen Sandow
 Žydrūnas Savickas
 Arthur Saxon
 Laurence Shahlaei
 Brian Shaw
 Brad Shepherd
 Mikhail Shivlyakov
 Jón Páll Sigmarsson
 Manjit Singh
 Richard Skog
 Luke Stoltman
 Tom Stoltman
 Braun Strowman

T
 Gary Taylor
 Oli Thompson
 Stojan Todorchev
 Warren Lincoln Travis

U
 Louis Uni (1862–1928), French strongman also known as Apollon

V
 Berend Veneberg
 Vasyl Virastyuk
 Janne Virtanen

W
 Clarence Weber
 Sebastian Wenta
 Marshall White
 Martin Wildauer
 Bruce Wilhelm
 Ab Wolders
 Simon Wulfse
 O.D. Wilson

Y
 Bob Young (1942–1995), American National Football League player who competed in the 1977 and 1979 World's Strongest Man competitions
 Doug Young

Z
 Wout Zijlstra

See also

 List of strongman competitions
 List of male professional bodybuilders
 List of female professional bodybuilders
 List of powerlifters

References

Strongmen
Strength athletics
Lists of sportsmen